Ward is a Canadian rural community in Westmorland County, New Brunswick. Located in the Sackville Parish.

History

Notable people

See also
List of communities in New Brunswick

References

Communities in Westmorland County, New Brunswick